The 1983 Ibero-American Championships (Spanish: I Campeonato Iberoamericano de Atletismo) was an athletics competition which was held at the Estadi Serrahima in Barcelona, Catalonia, Spain from 23–25 September 1983. A total of 37 events were contested, of which 22 by male and 15 by female athletes. It was the first edition of the Ibero-American Championships, although a precursor to the tournament, the Juegos Iberoamericanos (Ibero-American Games), had been held in 1960 and 1962. Eighteen countries participated, drawing from the 22 members of the Asociación Ibero-Americano de Atletismo (Ibero-American Athletics Association).

Cuba won the most gold medals with a total of nineteen, but it was Spain which had the largest overall haul, beating Cuba's 24 with a total of 33 medals. Brazil and Portugal, were the third and fourth most successful nations of the competition, although the latter won the largest number of silver medals (12) over the course of the three-day competition. The Ibero-American Championships succeeded in attracting a number of high-profile athletes from Ibero-American countries, thus beginning the history of the long-running championships.

Cuban athletes Luis Delís and Maritza Martén both doubled up to win the shot put and discus throw events for men and women, respectively. Aurora Cunha of Portugal took the victory in the women's 1500 metres and 3000 metres while Chile's Alejandra Ramos finished runner-up in both the 800 metres and 1500 m. Luisa Ferrer came close to a sprint double, but was beaten by Esmeralda de Jesus Garcia in the 100 metres. Two records from the championships were particularly long-lasting: Delís's discus record stood until the 2010 Ibero-American Championships and Domingo Ramón's mark in the 3000 metres steeplechase remains the championship record.

Medal summary

Men

† The 110 metres hurdles competition was won by Carlos Sala of Spain in 13.74 seconds, but he was competing as a "guest" athlete.

Women

Medal table

Note: The women's 400 metres medals (gold for Cuba, silver for Spain) were excluded in the official competition medal count.

Participation
Of the twenty-two founding members of the Asociación Iberoamericana de Atletismo, eighteen presented delegations for the inaugural championships. The four absent member countries were Ecuador, Panama, Puerto Rico and Venezuela. A total of 143 athletes participated in the first edition.  Including a number of guests, 163 participating athletes were counted by analysing the official result list.

 (10)
 (1)
 (12)
 (3)
 (6)
 (1)
 (21)
 (1)
 (1)
 (1)
 (1)
 (2)
 (1)
 (1)
 (1)
 (27)
 (72)
 (1)

References

Results
El Atletismo Ibero-Americano - San Fernando 2010. RFEA. Retrieved on 2011-11-14.

Ibero-American Championships in Athletics
Ibero-American
Ibero-American
International athletics competitions hosted by Spain
Athletics competitions in Catalonia
Athletics in Barcelona
Ibero-American Championships in Athletics